David Smith is a Scottish curler. He is the brother of curler Peter Smith and the father of curlers Mili Smith, Kyle Smith and Cameron Smith.

Career
In his very first international competition, the 1982 European Curling Championships, Smith won a gold medal playing second for Mike Hay.

By 1986, Smith was skipping his own team. He won a silver medal at his second  that year. His Scottish team lost to Canada, skipped by Ed Lukowich in the final 4-3. Two years later, he skipped the British team to an eighth-place finish at the 1988 Winter Olympics (curling was just a demonstration sport). That same year he won a bronze at the World Championships. Still in the same year, he won a second gold medal at the European Curling Championships.

In 1990 he won another silver medal at the World Championships, losing to Canada's Ed Werenich in the final 3-1. The following year he won the gold medal, defeating Canada's Kevin Martin in the final 7-2. Later that year he won a silver at the 1991 European Curling Championships followed by a bronze in 1992. In 1993 he won his third silver medal at the World Championships, losing again to Canada 8-4, this time skipped by Russ Howard.

In 1996, Smith joined forces with Warwick Smith, playing as his third. That year he won another silver medal losing once again to Canada – 6-2. Jeff Stoughton was the winning skip. In 1998, David Smith played his last Worlds as a skip, finishing in fourth place. Later that year he played third for Gordon Muirhead winning a silver medal at the European Championships.

Smith would not play at another international tournament until the 2007 Ford World Men's Curling Championship, playing second for Warwick. It would be David Smith's worst performance at an international tournament, when they finished in 9th place.

References

External links

 Video: 

Living people
Year of birth missing (living people)
Scottish male curlers
World curling champions
European curling champions
Scottish curling champions